Hylaeora eucalypti is a moth of the  family Notodontidae. It is found in the southern half of Australia, including the Australian states of South Australia, Victoria, New South Wales and Tasmania.

The larvae feed on Eucalyptus species.

External links
Australian Caterpillars

Notodontidae